Al Adams may refer to:

 Albert J. Adams (1845–1906), American racketeer
 J. Allen Adams (1932–2017), American politician and lawyer